WBNZ (92.3 FM)  is a radio station licensed to Frankfort, Michigan.

History
WBNZ first went on the air in October 1978 with a soft rock and local news format.  The general manager was Michael Bradford, a former DJ at WCCW in Traverse City.  It had live DJ's, including Bradford for the beloved local morning show, with a pre-recorded music format and local news. Network news was broadcast hourly from the ABC FM Network.

In July 2009, WOUF 92.3 FM Beulah and WBNZ 99.3 FM Frankfort swapped call signs and cities of license, with WBNZ's soft AC format moving to 92.3 and WOUF ("The Wolf") taking residence on 99.3 with a new format (changing from a country/southern rock hybrid to mainstream rock). 92.3, which formerly operated at 92.1 FM, has aired a variety of formats since first taking to the air in the mid-1990s, including simulcasts of then-99.3 WBNZ and 101.9 WLDR, and an '80s hits format (simulcast with 100.1) as WSRI/WSRQ "Star FM."

On October 22, 2014 WBNZ began simulcasting WLDR-FM 101.9 FM Traverse City as "The Bay".

On January 21, 2015 WBNZ went silent.

In early to mid July 2016, WBNZ was heard on the air with a simulcast of WLDR-FM as "101.9 the Bay", likely as a way to keep the license active. Throughout October 2016, the station was on and off the air again, still simulcasting The Bay, possibly for the same reason.

On October 1, 2018 WBNZ switched from a simulcast with WLDR-FM to a simulcast of sports-formatted WGRY-FM 101.1 FM Roscommon.

In October 2019 WBNZ went silent.

Sources
Michiguide.com - WBNZ History

External links

BNZ
Radio stations established in 1994
1994 establishments in Michigan